Welver is a municipality in the district of Soest, in North Rhine-Westphalia, Germany.

History
The town was once known as Villinghausen or Vellinghausen. The Seven Years' War Battle of Villinghausen was fought nearby.

Geography
Welver is situated approximately 12 km south-east of Hamm and 12 km north-west of Soest.

Neighbouring cities, towns, and municipalities
 Hamm, to the west and northwest
 Lippetal, to the north
 Soest, to the east and southeast
 Werl, to the southwest

Division of the municipality
After the local government reforms of 1969, Welver consists of the following villages:

References

External links
 Official site 

Soest (district)
Soest Börde